James Bray (11 October 1790 – 31 January 1869) was an English cricketer who played at the beginning of the 19th century.

Bray was born at Waldron in Sussex in 1790. He was a gamekeeper by trade and played cricket for Hawkhurst, close to the border between Sussex and Kent. He played in a total of eight first-class cricket matches between 1816 and 1827, four of which were for Sussex teams. He made his first-class debut in 1816 for Sussex, playing against Epsom at Lord's. In 1826 he played twice for Kent XIs against Sussex sides and the following year played twice for Sussex against Kent. He also played two first-class matches for The Bs, one in 1817 and the other, his final first-class match, in 1827.

Bray died at Waldron in 1869 aged 78.

References

1790 births
1869 deaths
English cricketers
English cricketers of 1787 to 1825
English cricketers of 1826 to 1863
Sussex cricketers
Kent cricketers
People from Heathfield, East Sussex
The Bs cricketers